Julia Csekö is an Artist, Educator and Independent Curator having worked at multiple learning, non-profits, and cultural organizations, including Montserrat College of Art, and the Museum of Fine Arts, Boston.

Most recently Csekö was awarded a Somerville Arts Council Fellowship 2021, the Community Curator award at the Somerville Museum 2021, an Artcubator Artist Residency at the Umbrella Center for the Arts 2020–21. In summer 2020 she was invited as a Visiting Artist by Emerson College to create a site-specific mural for the Piano Row Campus, featuring the words of late congressman John Lewis. In addition, she has a public mural on view at Winter Place, downtown Boston, commissioned by the Boston Downtown BID, and created in partnership with the Boston Literary District. In 2018 Csekö was invited to the Assets for Artists MassMoCA residency program where she further investigated her multi-disciplinary practice as a sculptor, painter, and performer.

Csekö cites the concept of the Greek agora as inspiration for her time based work. She seeks to create experiences where "performer and viewer, creation and consumption occupy the same space."

Csekö's work is in the permanent collection of the Morris and Helen Belkin Art Gallery and the Gilberto Chateaubriand Collection at the Museum of Modern Art, Rio de Janeiro. and at Emerson College, in Boston MA.

Early life and education 
Csekö was born in Colorado and grew up in Rio de Janeiro, Brazil. She received a Master of Fine Arts (MFA), from the School of the Museum of Fine Arts at Tufts University in 2013.

Awards 
 Somerville Arts Council Fellowship 2021
 Community Curator award at the Somerville Museum 2021
 Artcubator Artist in Residence at the Umbrella Center for the Arts
 Artist in Residence MAssMoCA, 2018.
 Walter Feldman Fellowship for Emerging Artists, 2015–2016. The fellowship culminated in her first American, solo exhibition Straight from the Heart—The Rant Series.

References

External links 
 Official Website.
 Dig Boston Interview 

American women artists
Year of birth missing (living people)
Living people
Museum of Fine Arts, Boston
School of the Museum of Fine Arts at Tufts alumni
21st-century American women
Montserrat College of Art faculty